The seventh season of the television comedy Portlandia premiered on IFC in the United States on January 5 and concluded on March 9, 2017 with a total of 10 episodes. The series stars Fred Armisen and Carrie Brownstein.

Cast

Main cast
Fred Armisen
Carrie Brownstein

Special guest cast
Kyle MacLachlan as Mr. Mayor

Guest stars

Production
IFC renewed Portlandia for a sixth and seventh season on February 10, 2015. The series was originally renewed until 2017 with this season intended to be the last, but Armisen and Brownstein hinted about the possibility of doing Season 8. Season 8 would eventually be announced as the last in January 2017.

Episodes

References

External links 

 

2017 American television seasons
Portlandia (TV series)